Justice Compton may refer to:

Allen T. Compton, associate justice of the Alaska Supreme Court
Christian Compton, associate justice of the Supreme Court of Virginia
Freeman W. Compton, associate justice of the Arkansas Supreme Court
James C. Compton, associate justice of the New Mexico Supreme Court